= The People Walker =

2016 service in Los Angeles, California

The People Walker is a service-for-hire to walk with individuals and provide motivation through conversation and companionship. The service was launched in Los Angeles, California in 2016 by actor Chuck McCarthy when he was in-between acting jobs and needed money. He initially advertised the business by posting fliers asking questions like “Need Motivation to walk”, “Scared to walk alone at night?”, “Don’t like walking alone at all?”, and “Don’t want people to see you walking alone and just assume you have no friends?” etc. which led to people contacting him to schedule walks. McCarthy describes the walks as “therapeutic” for both him and his clients. After receiving a large number of requests, McCarthy hired staff and began offering more locations.
